"Fit but You Know It" is a song by English rapper and producer Mike Skinner under the music project the Streets. It was released on 26 April 2004 as the lead single of the Streets' second studio album, A Grand Don't Come for Free (2004). The song reached number four on the UK Single Charts.

Background
Skinner told the Daily Star that the lyrics refer to former S Club 7 member Rachel Stevens who was embarking on a solo career at the time the song was recorded. He later denied the song was about Stevens and said that he threw her name out as a red herring to escape the nosey reporter's questions.

Critical reception
Leonie Cooper of NME called the "chugging beat" and "the extreme rowdiness of it all" the best parts of the song. James Snodgrass of NME called it, "a great first single, it takes a guitar chug and a boozy rant and combines them to joyous effect." Decca Aitkenhead of The Guardian said that the song "managed to capture the comically crude but complex sexual politics of a busy late-night chip shop on a lads' holiday".

Commercial performance
The single reached number four on the UK Singles Chart, spending 15 weeks inside the top 75. In Australia, the song was ranked number 18 on Triple J's Hottest 100 of 2004.

Music video
The music video for the single has a cameo of the cast of The Football Factory which includes Danny Dyer and Frank Harper. In the video, Mike Skinner plays the part of a man picking up his holiday photos from the developers. As the song is playing, he looks through the photos which show scenes from his holiday. The video was released on two separate formats- a DVD single (which also included the video for "The Irony of It All" and a bonus DVD which came with some copies of parent album A Grand Don't Come for Free.

Track listing

Charts

Certifications

Release history

References

2004 songs
2004 singles
The Streets songs
Locked On Records singles
679 Artists singles